Nishana is a 1950 Indian Hindi-language romantic drama film directed by Wajahat Mirza, and starring Madhubala, Ashok Kumar and Geeta Bali. The film's music was composed by Khurshid Anwar.

Nishana was the first time Madhubala appeared opposite Ashok Kumar after their blockbuster Mahal (1949). The film's box office success cemented her star status. It also further popularised the onscreen pairing of Madhubala and Kumar, who went on to star in Ek Saal (1957), Howrah Bridge (1958) and Chalti Ka Naam Gaadi (1958).

Plot 
The film revolves around Mohan (Kumar), a wealthy brat who is raised by his hot tempered, arrogant father (Kanhaiyalal). When his father forces him to get married and settle down, Mohan secretly employs a cheerful dancing girl, Chanda (Bali), to pose as his wife in front of his parents. Chanda however ends ups falling in love with Mohan. In the meantime, he meets Radha (Madhubala), an orphan. They are attracted towards each other and indulge in a sexual intercourse. Drama ensues when Radha becomes pregnant with Mohan's child and his father throws him out of his house for cheating with his "wife". His father dies soon. An ostracized Radha also kills herself after giving birth to her child. In the end, Mohan and Chanda adopt the girl child and name her Radha.

Cast 

The film's main cast includes:
 Madhubala as Radha
 Ashok Kumar as Mohan
 Geeta Bali as Chanda
 Kanhaiyalal as Mohan's father
 Durga Khote as Mohan's mother
 Shyama as Radha's friend

Soundtrack

References

Sources

External links 
 

1950 films
Indian romantic drama films
1950s Hindi-language films
1950 romantic drama films